Chaudry Sher Ali Khan is a Pakistani politician who was a Member of the Provincial Assembly of the Punjab, from 2008 to May 2018.

Early life and education
He was born on 24 July 1961 in Rawalpindi.

He received his early education from Aitchison College. He has a degree of Bachelor of Science which he obtained in 1981 from F. G. Sir Syed College.

Political career
He was elected to the Provincial Assembly of the Punjab as a candidate of Pakistan Muslim League (Q) (PML-Q) from Constituency PP-17 (Attock-III) in 2008 Pakistani general election. He received 41,409 votes and defeated a candidate of Pakistan Peoples Party.
He is cousin of Prince Malik Ata Muhammad Khan and Malik Saeed Muhammad Khan. 
In 2010, he left PML-Q to join Pakistan Muslim League (N) (PML-N).

He was re-elected to the Provincial Assembly of the Punjab as a candidate of PML-N from Constituency PP-18 (Attock-IV) in 2013 Pakistani general election. In June 2013, he was inducted into the provincial cabinet of Chief Minister Shahbaz Sharif and was made Provincial Minister of Punjab for Energy with the additional portfolio of Mines and Mineral. He remained Minister for Energy until November 2013.

References

Living people
Punjab MPAs 2013–2018
Punjab MPAs 2008–2013
1961 births
Pakistan Muslim League (N) politicians
Aitchison College alumni